Tarak Jallouz (born 1 November 1993) is a Tunisian handball player for Espérance de Tunis and the Tunisian national team.

He participated at the 2017 World Men's Handball Championship.

References

1993 births
Living people
Tunisian male handball players